Andrew Miles Hillenburg (born April 30, 1963) is an American former professional stock car racing driver and current team owner and track owner. His race team, Fast Track Racing, fields multiple cars in the ARCA Menards Series and formerly fielded entries in the NASCAR Cup Series and NASCAR Camping World Truck Series. He is credited with reviving the North Carolina Speedway, now known as Rockingham Speedway, after the track lost its NASCAR dates starting in 2005.

Racing career
Hillenburg was born in Indianapolis, Indiana. He began his racing career at age 11 when he competed in the Indianapolis soap box derby.

He won the state quarter midget championships in 1975–1979. Hillenburg won the ARCA Super Car Series Championship in 1995, with 3 time ARCA Champion Bob Dotter as Crew Chief. He won the 1995 and 1997 Daytona ARCA 200, the premiere event in the series.

He served as a test driver for the International Race of Champions and Team Racing Auto Circuit series. He competed in the 2000 Indianapolis 500, finishing 28th, and has sixteen Winston Cup starts nine Busch Series starts and four in the Craftsman Truck Series. His best finish in NASCAR was a third-place finish at the 1999 NAPA Auto Parts 300, where he finished 3rd in the #18 MBNA Pontiac Grand Prix for Joe Gibbs Racing.

Team owner
Hillenburg operates the Fast Track High Performance Driving School and owns a team that competes ARCA Menards Series, Fast Track High Performance Racing (usually just known as Fast Track Racing or Fast Track Racing Enterprises). They currently field multiple entries with the Nos. 01, 10, 11, and 12 cars. 

Fast Track also formerly fielded entries in NASCAR's top three series. Most notably, they fielded the No. 47 and 48 teams in the NASCAR Truck Series between 2007 and 2010. He previously had fielded a No. 10 truck in two races in 2003 NASCAR Craftsman Truck Series. 

In the NASCAR Busch Series (now Xfinity), Hillenburg entered one race in both 1992 and 1993 in his car, the No. 42, before running a part-time schedule of six races in 1994, although he only qualified for one of those six races. His team did not return until 1997, where he entered his own No. 25 car at Dover. This was his last attempt as a car owner in that series. 

Besides two races in 1992, Fast Track's only Cup Series attempt came in the 2007 Daytona 500, with them entering the No. 71 Ford driven by Frank Kimmel in the 2007 Daytona 500, but the entry did not make the field.

Track owner
On October 2, 2007, Hillenburg purchased North Carolina Speedway in Rockingham, North Carolina for $4.4 million (USD). The track was put up for auction by Speedway Motorsports Inc. and chairman Bruton Smith. Rockingham had not hosted a NASCAR event since 2004, but Hillenburg hopes to bring lower-tier NASCAR series back to the track. On May 4, 2008, the ARCA RE/MAX Series raced at Rockingham in the Carolina 500 and again in 2009. Also in 2008, the USAR Hooters Procup Series had their final race of the season at the Rockingham Speedway, in a race called the American 200 (named in honor of the name for the first race run at the Rock in 1965, the American 500) on November 1, 2008. The track hosted its first NASCAR sanctioned race (a Camping World Truck Series race) since its 2004 closure on April 15, 2012. Rockingham became part of the regular schedule for that series, and they returned in 2013. However, Rockingham was removed from the series' 2014 schedule.

Acting
He has also acted in a few movies, including 3: The Dale Earnhardt Story on ESPN, Herbie: Fully Loaded, and Talladega Nights: The Ballad of Ricky Bobby.

Hillenburg also was a technical advisor and provided equipment for the filming of the Bollywood film Ta Ra Rum Pum, which was filmed at Rockingham and also at the ARCA race at the Milwaukee Mile.

Personal life
Hillenburg has been married since 1991 and is the father of four children.

Motorsports career results

NASCAR
(key) (Bold – Pole position awarded by qualifying time. Italics – Pole position earned by points standings or practice time. * – Most laps led.)

Nextel Cup Series

Daytona 500

Busch Series

Craftsman Truck Series

ARCA Re/Max Series
(key) (Bold – Pole position awarded by qualifying time. Italics – Pole position earned by points standings or practice time. * – Most laps led.)

IRL IndyCar Series

Indianapolis 500 results

References

External links
 
 
 
 Andy Hillenburg at the Indianapolis Motor Speedway
 Rockingham Speedway
 Fast Track Racing website

Living people
1963 births
Racing drivers from Indianapolis
Indianapolis 500 drivers
NASCAR drivers
ARCA Menards Series drivers
NASCAR team owners
USAC Silver Crown Series drivers